In Bavaria and in Württemberg-Baden, Radio München (Munich) and Radio Stuttgart went on air in 1945. In the next years, Radio München was transformed to a Bavarian broadcaster, and in Germany's South West, two public broadcasting corporations started and produced radio and (subsequent) television programs up to their merger in 1998:

 Südwestfunk, SWF, in the former French zone, founded in 1946, and
 Süddeutscher Rundfunk, called "Südfunk", short SDR, founded in 1949.

The southwestern part of Germany was at the time was split after the end of World War II into two occupation zones, an American and a French one and each of these two broadcasters operated in the subsequent two German States of Baden-Württemberg and Rhineland-Palatinate. In 1998, the SDR and SWF merged into a single unified Südwestrundfunk (SWR). The German word Rundfunk means broadcasting (corporation), and the ending "-funk" in Südwestfunk and Südfunk is short for Rundfunk, or means 'radio (program)'.

Südwestfunk 

The Südwestfunk (SWF) was a German radio and television station with its head office in Baden-Baden and with radio and TV-studios there and in the old arsenal of Mainz. It was operating in the former French zone of Germany, which became the southern part of Baden-Württemberg and the Land of Rhineland-Palatinate. Those regions are not as densely populated as the North of Baden-Württemberg with Süddeutscher Rundfunk.

The Südwestfunk was member of the ARD and produced TV programs for ARD and in cooperation with Süddeutscher Rundfunk for Südwest 3 (a so-called "drittes Programm" / 3rd TV-program), with Saarländischer Rundfunk as third partner for this regional television program. Südwestfunk also produced 4 radio programs,

 SWF1 (pop) music and information, sports and entertaining shows
 S2 Kultur with classical music, radio dramas, radio features (in cooperation with Südfunk SDR)
 SWF3 pop and rock music, "new pop" and information,
 S4 Baden-Württemberg (cooperation SDR) and SWF4 Rheinland-Pfalz with regional programmes and 'melodious music'.
SWF3 was one of the most popular radio stations in Germany, with many listeners near the borders of its area, in Stuttgart, in Frankfurt and especially in Cologne, the same as today SWR3.
 Orchestra: The SWF Sinfonieorchester Baden-Baden was renowned for its interpretations of contemporary classical music that could often be heard at the Donaueschingen Festival.

Süddeutscher Rundfunk 

The Süddeutsche Rundfunk (SDR) was a German radio and television station operating in the northern part of the Land of Baden-Württemberg.

It existed from 1949 to 1998, when it was merged with Südwestfunk to form the Südwestrundfunk. Süddeutscher Rundfunk was briefly called Südfunk and had its head office at Stuttgart, with radio and TV-studios there and in Karlsruhe and Heidelberg (in the 80's moved to Mannheim) and radio studios also in Ulm and Heilbronn.

The Süddeutsche Rundfunk was member of the ARD and produced programs (program items) for the joint channel/program Deutsches Fernsehen (German Television, today Das Erste). Moreover, SDR ran in cooperation with SWF a regional TV channel, "Südwest 3".

The Südfunk started with radio in 1949, in the 1980s, it produced 4 radio programmes:
 
 SDR1 (Südfunk 1) information, background and music, 
 SDR3 (Südfunk 3) pop music radio for young listeners, including information (news and magazines)
 in cooperation with Südwestfunk: 
 S2 Kultur for classical music and culture, 
 S4 Baden-Württemberg with regional programmes and 'melodious music'.

In 1952, Süddeutscher Rundfunk founded a festival for classical music and opera in the area of Heidelberg, the famous Schwetzingen Festival. 
 Radio chorus: the Südfunk-Chor Stuttgart is now the SWR Vokalensemble.
 Orchestra: the Südfunk-Sinfonieorchester, later Sinfonieorchester des Süddeutschen Rundfunks is now Radio-Sinfonieorchester Stuttgart RSO (Stuttgart Radio Symphony Orchestra).
 see also Erwin Lehn (big band).

SDR-SWF cooperation for television 
SDR and SWF were both members of ARD, the Consortium of the public-law broadcasting institutions of the Federal Republic of Germany. This consortium represents common interests of its members and coordinates their work. The design of a network of foreign (radio) correspondents is one example. The new member of ARD from 1998 is SWR.

ARD especially works as a sort of TV-network and has run the first German TV-channel from its start, called Deutsches Fernsehen. Each member of ARD produces programs for this channel, which is today Das Erste. After the start of ZDF as second channel in 1963, the public broadcasters of ARD came up with regional television, so-called "Drittes Programm" (3rd TV-program). Südwestfunk and Süddeutscher Rundfunk had a collaboration for a Drittes Programm, called Südwest 3, with Saarländischer Rundfunk as a third partner. In 1998, Südwest 3 became SWR Fernsehen.

See also
History of television in Germany

Südwestrundfunk
ARD (broadcaster)
Radio stations in Germany